= Hallesche Beiträge zur Orientwissenschaft =

- Discipline: Oriental studies
- Language: German (some English)
- Edited by: Markus Mode, Jürgen Tubach

Publication details
- Publisher: Martin Luther University Halle-Wittenberg (Germany)
- Frequency: Irregular
- Open access: Yes

Standard abbreviations
- ISO 4: Hallesche Beitr. Orientwiss.

Indexing
- ISSN: 0233-2205

Links
- Journal homepage

Hallesche Beiträge zur Orientwissenschaft is an academic journal of oriental studies published by the Martin Luther University of Halle-Wittenberg. The editors are Markus Mode and Jürgen Tubach. It was founded in 1979 by Burchard Brentjes, Manfred Fleischhammer, and Peter Nagel, who were the joint editors in its early years. It is published on an irregular schedule.
